This is a list of public art in the Gloucestershire county of England. This list applies only to works of public art on permanent display in an outdoor public space. For example, this does not include artworks in museums.

Cheltenham

Gloucester

Tewkesbury

References 

Glo
Public art
Public art